TRIM52, also known as RNF102, is a protein in the tripartite motif family. In humans, it is encoded by the gene of the same name. Knockdown of this gene induces apoptosis. This gene's overexpression has been implicated in multiple types of cancer including ovarian cancer, gastric cancer, and colon cancer.

References

Proteins
Oncogenes